Koniecpol  is a town in Częstochowa County, Silesian Voivodeship, Poland, with 5,910 inhabitants (2019). In the times of Polish–Lithuanian Commonwealth it was the seat of the Koniecpolski magnate family.

Twin towns – sister cities
See twin towns of Gmina Koniecpol.

References

External links

Jewish Community in Koniecpol on Virtual Shtetl

Cities and towns in Silesian Voivodeship
Częstochowa County
Piotrków Governorate
Łódź Voivodeship (1919–1939)